The Boston Record was founded on September 3, 1884, by  The Boston Daily Advertiser as an evening campaign newspaper.  The Record was so popular that it was made a permanent publication. It was the first tabloid-format newspaper in New England.

Begun as the Afternoon Record, it was bought by William Randolph Hearst in 1921 and known as the Daily Record by the 1930s. It was merged with another Hearst newspaper, the Evening American, to form the Record American in 1961. In 1972, this was merged into the Boston Herald-Traveler, which later became the Boston Herald.

Notable staff
 Leo Monahan –  sports journalist who wrote for the Daily Record and the Record American

References

Bibliography
 Stanwood, Edward.: Boston Illustrated: Containing Full Descriptions of the City and Its Immediate Suburbs, Its Public Buildings and Institutions, Business Edifices, Parks and Avenues, Statues, Harbor and Islands, Etc., Etc. With Numerous Historical Allusions, Houghton, Mifflin and Co, The Riverside Press, (1886) p. 104.

See also

 The Boston Daily Advertiser
 The Boston Herald
 The Boston Globe
 The Boston Journal
 The Boston News-Letter
 The Boston Post
''The Boston Evening Transcript

Newspapers published in Boston
Defunct newspapers published in Massachusetts
Defunct companies based in Massachusetts